Michael R. Steck (born May 2, 1972), better known by the stage name Pandora Boxx, is an American drag queen, comedian, and reality television personality from Rochester, New York. Boxx competed in the second season of RuPaul's Drag Race, placing fifth and winning Miss Congeniality, and subsequently returned for the first and sixth seasons of RuPaul's Drag Race All Stars. Boxx also appeared in all three seasons of the Drag Race spin-off series RuPaul's Drag U.

Early life
Michael Steck was born to Sharon Steck in Jamestown, New York. He has a sister, Susanne. The family later moved to Olean, New York. Steck was inspired to do drag after watching the eventual season six contestant Darienne Lake perform in an outdoor festival in Rochester, New York. For his first show at the gay bar Infinity in Rochester, Steck chose his drag name as a play on words of Pandora's box, an artifact found in Greek mythology.

Career
Boxx auditioned twice before becoming a contestant on the second season of RuPaul's Drag Race. Highlights of her performance on Drag Race include an impersonation of Carol Channing on "Snatch Game" (a Match Game parody challenge). Performing well in the show's challenges, her failure to win one resulted in RuPaul calling her "the Susan Lucci of this competition." She was eliminated in the eighth episode, "Golden Gals." After her elimination, Entertainment Weekly called her their pick for "America's Next Drag Superstar." She was later voted the Miss Congeniality of her season.

After her elimination, Boxx appeared on the three seasons of the Drag Race spin-off series RuPaul's Drag U. She also appeared in a television commercial for Absolut Vodka that aired during the third season of Drag Race dressed as a Bloody Mary.

In 2011, she hosted an episode of Logo's One Night Stand Up, a comedy special filmed live in the Bowery Ballroom in New York City. Other performers included Bianca Del Rio, Hedda Lettuce, and Kelly Mantle. Later that year, Boxx appeared in an Entertainment Weekly photo spread along with Mimi Imfurst that featured Melissa McCarthy channeling Divine. On September 27, 2011, Boxx released her first single "Cooter!"

Boxx and Sherry Vine released "Give Me All Your Muff", a parody of "Give Me All Your Luvin'" by Madonna in 2012. In addition, Boxx released several singles in 2012: a cover version of Samantha Fox's hit song "I Wanna Have Some Fun" and the original song "Nice Car! (Shame About Your Penis)."

In 2012, Sharon Needles won the online voting to appear on RuPaul's Drag Race: All Stars, but revealed that she was not going to participate due to the fact she was the reigning winner of the fourth season. Needles also confirmed that Boxx was her replacement and would appear on the show. Boxx, along with team partner Mimi Imfurst, formed Team Mandora, and they were the first two contestants eliminated on All Stars, placing 11th/12th.

After All Stars 1, Boxx was a playable character with Manila Luzon and Yara Sofia for the "RuPaul's Drag Race: Dragopolis" mobile app.

In 2013, Boxx began hosting Drag Race recaps for NewNowNext on Logo, called "Drag Center". She also released a single with Adam Barta called "You Seemed Shady to Me", which hit Top 50 on the iTunes comedy single charts.

She was one of thirty drag queens featured in Miley Cyrus's 2015 VMA performance.

In 2018, Boxx released "Oops I Think I Pooped", a parody of "This Is How We Do" by Katy Perry. The Music Video featured fellow RuPaul's Drag Race'''s contestants Alaska Thunderfuck, Jasmine Masters and Mariah Paris Balenciaga, as well as Jai Rodriguez from Queer Eye.

In May 2019, Boxx appeared on stage during the performance of Christine and the Queens at the season finale for the eleventh season of RuPaul's Drag Race.

On May 26, 2021, it was revealed that Pandora would be competing in the sixth season of RuPaul's Drag Race All Stars alongside 12 other contestants, including fellow season 2 contestant Kylie Sonique Love and fellow All Stars' season 1 contestant Yara Sofia, where she placed 6th. She performed at the Inaugural Jamestown LGBTQ Pride Festival on June 12th, 2021.

Other work
Besides appearing on Drag Race, she wrote, directed, produced, and appeared in Mrs. Kasha Davis: The Life of an International Housewife Celebrity starring fellow drag performer from Rochester's Tilt nightclub, Mrs. Kasha Davis.
Boxx also wrote a play, The Lipstick Massacre, directed by David Henderson and starring herself and actress Kasha Davis. The plot follows a commercial actress, Daphne Von Hausenpfeffer, whose career is fading. When other actresses up for the same roles start disappearing, it seems Daphne may be the prime suspect. It was described as "a new murder mystery/B-horror movie/comedy play." The Lipstick Massacre'' has played at Rochester's Multi-use Community Cultural Center, and the Geva Theatre.

She is usually credited as "Michael Steck" for creative roles.

Personal life
Steck identifies as gender-fluid. Steck became engaged on Christmas Day, 2010, making an announcement via Twitter.

Discography

Singles

As featured artist

Filmography

Film

Television

Theatre

Music video appearances

Web series

References

External links

Living people
American drag queens
American gay actors
American gay musicians
People from Jamestown, New York
People from Olean, New York
People from Rochester, New York
Pandora Boxx
Pandora Boxx
1972 births
20th-century American LGBT people
21st-century American LGBT people
Genderfluid people
Non-binary drag performers